Beaver River is a tributary of the Ohio River in Western Pennsylvania. It has a length of approximately 21 mi (34 km) and flows through a historically important coal-producing region north of Pittsburgh. Beaver River is formed in Lawrence County by the confluence of the Mahoning and Shenango rivers in the Mahoningtown neighborhood of New Castle. It flows generally south, past West Pittsburg and Homewood. It receives Connoquenessing Creek west of Ellwood City and flows past Beaver Falls and New Brighton. It joins the Ohio at Bridgewater and Rochester (flowing between these two towns) at the downstream end of a sharp bend in the Ohio approximately 20 mi (32 km) northwest of (and downstream from) Pittsburgh. In the lower reaches near the Ohio River, the Beaver cuts through a gorge of underlying sandstone. The river is roughly parallel to the border with the state of Ohio, with both Interstate 376 and Pennsylvania Route 18 running parallel to the river itself.

The river, which flows throughout the northern half of Beaver County, serves as the namesake of the county as well as several locales in both Beaver and Lawrence County. The river itself was either named for King Beaver (Tamaqua) of the Delaware nation that had migrated to the area in the late 1740s, or for the animal itself. Until the partition of Lawrence County from parts of Beaver and Mercer County in 1849, the river was entirely located in Beaver County, with its upstream terminus being at the border between Beaver and Mercer County from 1800-1849.

Communities along the river
West Pittsburg
Wampum
Koppel
Homewood
Beaver Falls
Eastvale
New Brighton
Fallston
Rochester
Bridgewater

See also
List of crossings of the Beaver River
List of rivers of Pennsylvania

References

External links

U.S. Geological Survey: PA stream gaging stations
Penn State Univ.:Geography of Beaver County Pennsylvania

 
Rivers of Pennsylvania
Tributaries of the Ohio River
Rivers of Beaver County, Pennsylvania
Rivers of Lawrence County, Pennsylvania
Allegheny Plateau